The 24 cm K L/35 was a German naval gun developed in the years before World War I that armed ships of the Imperial German Navy, Argentine Navy and the Austro-Hungarian Navy. Guns removed from ships of the Imperial German Navy were modified to perform Coastal Artillery and Railway Artillery roles and saw service in both world wars.

History
In 1888 Krupp designed the 24 cm K L/35 and started production to arm two classes of the Imperial German Navy's coastal defense ships.  Krupp also produced guns for export that armed one class of coastal defense ships for Argentina and one class of protected cruisers and one unique armored cruiser for Austria-Hungary. The Ottoman s were rearmed with these guns in the early 1890s.

Naval Artillery
The 24 cm K L/35 was the primary armament of the Siegfried-class and Odin-class coastal defense ships of the Imperial German Navy.

German ship details:
Siegfried-class - The six ships of this class had a primary armament of three guns in an unusual arrangement.  Two MPL C/88 single gun turrets were mounted side-by-side forward, while a third was mounted aft of the central superstructure in a single gun turret.
Odin-class - The two ships of this class had a primary armament of three guns in an unusual arrangement.  Two MPL C/93 single gun turrets were mounted side-by-side forward, while a third was mounted aft of the central superstructure in a single gun turret.

The 24 cm K L/35 was also the primary armament of the Argentine Navy's Independencia-class coastal defense ships.
Argentine ship details:
 Independencia-class – The two ships of this class had a primary armament of two guns, which were mounted in two single gun turrets, one fore and one aft of the central superstructure.

The 24 cm K L/35 was the primary armament of the Kaiser Franz Joseph I-class of protected cruisers and the unique armored cruiser SMS Kaiserin und Königin Maria Theresia.
Austro-Hungarian ship details:
Kaiser Franz Joseph I-class  - The two ships of this class had a primary armament of two guns, which were mounted in two single gun turrets, one fore and one aft of the central superstructure.

SMS Kaiserin und Königin Maria Theresia - This ship had a primary armament of two guns, which were mounted in two single gun turrets, one fore and one aft of the central superstructure.

Coastal Artillery
During 1916 the Odin-class ships were decommissioned and disarmed.  The 24 cm K L/35 guns salvaged from these ships were converted to coastal artillery.  Three guns were emplaced at Battery Bremen on Norderney and three guns were emplaced at Battery S1 on Sylt.  They remained there until the late 1930s.

There are currently four guns belonging to battery No4 at Puerto Belgrano, Argentina.

Ottoman Empire purchased thirty 24 cm K L/35 guns during the 1880s and a number of these engaged the allied naval forces during the Gallipoli campaign.

Railway Artillery 
Beginning in 1937 the six guns at Norderny and Sylt were converted to railway artillery and were collectively known as 24 cm Theodor Bruno Kanone (E).  During the Battle of France Theodor Brunos equipped three batteries of two guns each.  Later one battery of four guns defended Cherbourg Naval Base from 1941 until June 1944 when they were destroyed during the Battle of Cherbourg.

Photo Gallery

Bibliography

References

External links 
 http://www.navweaps.com/Weapons/WNGER_945-35_skc88.php
 http://navalhistory.flixco.info/H/229314x54503/8330/a0.htm

Naval guns of Germany
Naval guns of Austria-Hungary
World War I naval weapons
240 mm artillery